Harry Edward Vickers (3 September 1888 – 9 December 1942) was a cat-burglar who was active in the 1920s and 1930s. He wore flannel over his shoes to muffle his footsteps, which earned him the nickname Flannelfoot.

His ability to avoid detection and capture by the Metropolitan Police was the subject of media sensation. Whilst the police knew his identity, they lacked evidence to arrest him. He was sentenced in December 1937 to five years penal servitude for housebreaking.

Vickers used rags or cloth taken from the houses he burgled to muffle his footsteps. He stole and discarded a bicycle as part of his getaway. Upon finding these items, police were able to attribute the crime to Vickers with confidence. Vickers also opened windows by drilling a single hole close to the latch.

Military service  
Vickers served as a rifleman in the Rifle Brigade from July 1916 to July 1918 on active service in France and Flanders. He sustained a serious leg injury that prevented him from serving, and was awarded the Silver War Badge along with the Victory Medal and British War Medal.

Criminal history

Early crimes 

 September 1921: Vickers broke into the house of a prominent local singer at Hounslow.
 March 1922: Vickers raided houses in Aylett Road, Isleworth. He took money from gas meters and a handbag, but left a child's money box unopened despite moving it.
 November 1922: Break-ins at Isleworth in South-Western Terrace were reported, where gas meters were robbed, and attributed to Vickers.
 October 1923: Vickers was attributed to several burglaries in the Harrow district. Entry was gained in most cases by drilling a hole in a scullery or kitchen window frame to insert a wire and lift the latch.
 November 1923: Burglaries on one night in Carlton Avenue, Kenton, were attributed to Vickers. Small articles and loose money were taken and a hearty meal made in one of the houses.
 May 1927: Eight burglaries at Kenton Park Crescent were believed to be committed by Vickers.

Identification by Scotland Yard 
In May 1934, Scotland Yard had circulated a girl's picture in the hunt for Flannelfoot. She was the 13-year-old daughter of a Reading butcher named Henry Williams, also known as Harry Edward Vickers.

Capture and sentencing
In December 1937, Vickers was arrested and tried at the Middlesex Sessions.

References

Further reading
 Great Cases of Scotland Yard
 Horwell of the Yard

References 

1888 births
1942 deaths
British Army personnel of World War I
British burglars
Rifle Brigade soldiers